This article is about the demographic features of the population of Seychelles, including population density, ethnicity, education level, health of the populace, economic status, religious affiliations and other aspects of the population.

About 90% of the Seychellois people live on the island of Mahé. Most of the rest live on Praslin and La Digue, with the remaining smaller islands either sparsely populated or uninhabited.

Most Seychellois are descendants of early French settlers and East Africans who arrived in the 19th century. Tamils, along with other South Indians and Chinese (1.1% of the population) account for the other permanent inhabitants. About 1,703 (2000) expatriates live and work in Seychelles. In 1901, there were roughly 3500 Tamil speakers out of the country's population of 19,237. Tamil immigrants arrived in Seychelles as early as 1770 and were among the first settlers to the originally sparsely inhabited island nation.

Seychelles culture is a mixture of French and African (Creole) influences. The local Seychellois Creole (Kreol), a creole language derived from French and African tongues, is the native language of 91.8% of the people; but English and French are also commonly used. English remains the language of government and commerce.

About 91.9% of the adult population is literate, and the literacy rate of school-aged children has risen to well over 98%. Increases are expected, as nearly all children of primary school age attend school, and the government encourages adult education.

Vital statistics

Structure of the population 

Structure of the population (2013 estimates):

Population Estimates by Sex and Age Group (01.VII.2020):

Other demographic statistics 
Demographic statistics according to the World Population Review in 2022.

One birth every 360 minutes	
One death every 720 minutes	
One net migrant every 1440 minutes	
Net gain of one person every 1440 minutes

The following demographic are from the CIA World Factbook unless otherwise indicated.

Population
97,017 (2022 est.)
96,387 (July 2021 est.)

Religions
Roman Catholic 76.2%, Protestant 10.5% (Anglican 6.1%, Pentecostal Assembly 1.5%, Seventh Day Adventist 1.2%, other Protestant 1.7%), other Christian 2.4%, Hindu 2.4%, Muslim 1.6%, other non-Christian 1.1%, unspecified 4.8%, none 0.9% (2010 est.)

Age structure 

0-14 years: 18.85% (male 9,297 /female 8,798)
15-24 years: 12.39% (male 6,283 /female 5,607)
25-54 years: 49.03% (male 25,209 /female 21,851)
55-64 years: 11.46% (male 5,545 /female 5,455)
65 years and over: 8.27% (male 3,272 /female 4,664) (2020 est.)

0–14 years: 26.4% (male 10,839; female 10,601)
15–64 years: 67.4% (male 26,709; female 28,025)
65 years and over: 6.2% (male 1,622; female 3,392) (2005 est.)

Median age
total: 36.8 years. Country comparison to the world: 76th
male: 36.3 years 
female: 37.4 years (2020 est.)

Birth rate
12.37 births/1,000 population (2022 est.) Country comparison to the world: 148th
12.63 births/1,000 population (2021 est.) Country comparison to the world: 146th

Death rate
6.88 deaths/1,000 population (2022 est.) Country comparison to the world: 123rd
6.83 deaths/1,000 population (2021 est.) Country comparison to the world: 125th

Total fertility rate
1.82 children born/woman (2022 est.) Country comparison to the world: 141st
1.75 children born/woman (2005 est.)

Population growth rate
0.64% (2022 est.) Country comparison to the world: 139th
0.67% (2021 est.) Country comparison to the world: 142nd
0.79% (2005 est.)

Demographics profile

Seychelles has very little indigenous population and was first permanently settled by a small group of French colonizers, African, and South Indians in 1770. Seychelles’ modern population is composed of the descendants of French and later British colonizers, Africans, and Indian, Chinese, and Middle Eastern traders and is concentrated on three of its 155 islands – the vast majority on Mahe and lesser numbers on Praslin and La Digue. Seychelles’ population grew rapidly during the second half of the 20th century, largely due to natural increase, but the pace has slowed because of fertility decline. The total fertility rate dropped sharply from 4.0 children per woman in 1980 to 1.9 in 2015, mainly as a result of a family planning program, free education and health care, and increased female labor force participation. Life expectancy has increased steadily, but women on average live 9 years longer than men, a difference that is higher than that typical of developed countries.

The combination of reduced fertility and increased longevity has resulted in an aging population, which will put pressure on the government's provision of pensions and health care. Seychelles’ sustained investment in social welfare services, such as free primary health care and education up to the post-secondary level, have enabled the country to achieve a high human development index score, among the highest in Africa. Despite some of its health and education indicators being nearly on par with Western countries, Seychelles has a high level of income inequality.

Net migration rate
0.86 migrant(s)/1,000 population (2022 est.) Country comparison to the world: 67th
0.9 migrant(s)/1,000 population (2021 est.) Country comparison to the world: 62nd

Dependency ratios
total dependency ratio: 46.7 (2020 est.)
youth dependency ratio: 34.9 (2020 est.)
elderly dependency ratio: 11.8 (2020 est.)
potential support ratio: 8.5 (2020 est.)

Urbanization
urban population: 58.4% of total population (2022)
rate of urbanization: 0.99% annual rate of change (2020-25 est.)

urban population: 55.7% of total population (2018)
rate of urbanization: 1.26% annual rate of change (2015-20 est.)

Life expectancy at birth
total population: 76.1 years. Country comparison to the world: 109th
male: 71.67 years
female: 80.66 years (2022 est.)

total population: 75.8 years 
male: 71.4 years 
female: 80.4 years (2021 est.)

Sex ratio 
at birth:
1.03 male(s)/female
under 15 years:
1.06 male(s)/female
15-64 years:
0.95 male(s)/female
65 years and over:
0.70 male(s)/female
total population:
1.07 male(s)/female (2005 est.)

Nationality
noun: Seychellois (singular and plural), adjective: Seychelles

Ethnic groups
predominantly creole (mainly of East African and Malagasy heritage); also French, Indian, Chinese, and Arab populations

Languages
Seychellois Creole (official) 89.1%, English (official) 5.1%, French (official) 0.7%, Other 3.8%, Unspecified 1.4% (2010 est.)

Education expenditures
3.9% of GDP (2019) Country comparison to the world: 110th

Literacy
definition: age 15 and over can read and write
total population: 95.9% 
male: 95.4% 
female: 96.4% (2018 est.)

total population: 91.9%
male: 91.4%
female: 92.3% (2003 est.)

School life expectancy (primary to tertiary education)
total: 14 years
male: 13 years
female: 15 years (2020)

Unemployment, youth ages 15-24
total: 16.4%
male: 17.4%
female: 15.5% (2020 est.)

Census
The Seychelles census has now been postponed by one year, from August 2020 to August 2021. Field mapping, questionnaire design, and pretest of data collection tools using tablets, are all proceeding.

References

 
Society of Seychelles